Leupeptin, also known as N-acetyl-L-leucyl-L-leucyl-L-argininal, is a naturally occurring protease inhibitor that can inhibit cysteine, serine and threonine peptidases.

It is often used during in vitro experiments when a specific enzymatic reaction is being studied. When cells are lysed for these studies, proteases, many of which are contained within lysosomes, are released. These proteases, if freely present in the lysate, would destroy any products from the reaction being studied, and make the experiment uninterpretable. For example, leupeptin could be used in a calpain extraction to keep calpain from being hydrolyzed by specific proteases. The suggested concentration is 1-10 μM (0.5-5 μg/ml).

Leupeptin is an organic compound produced by actinomycetes, which inhibits serine, cysteine and threonine proteases.  Leupeptin inhibits serine proteinases (trypsin (Ki=3.5 nM), plasmin (Ki= 3.4 nM), porcine kallikrein), and cysteine proteinases (papain, cathepsin B (Ki = 4.1 nM), endoproteinase Lys-C). It does not inhibit α-chymotrypsin or thrombin. Leupeptin is a competitive transition state inhibitor and its inhibition may be relieved by an excess of substrate.

Leupeptin is soluble in water (stable for 1 week at 4 °C and 1 month at −20 °C), ethanol, acetic acid and DMF.

It can be given topically for middle and inner ear infections.

References

Protease inhibitors
Tripeptides